It's Not Cricket may refer to:
 It's Not Cricket (1937 film), a British comedy film starring Claude Hulbert
 It's Not Cricket (1949 film), a British comedy film starring Basil Radford and Naunton Wayne
 It's not cricket, an English language phrase meaning unsportsmanlike conduct in sports, in business, or in life in general
 "It's Not Cricket", a song by the band Squeeze from their album Cool for Cats